ICAR may refer to:
 I Car or HR 4102, a star in the Carina constellation
 i Car or HD 79447, a star in the Carina constellation
 ι Car or Iota Carinae (HD 80404), a star in the Carina constellation
Indian Council of Agricultural Research
Information Centre about Asylum and Refugees
International Corporate Accountability Roundtable
Circuit ICAR, a motorsports complex
iCar (magazine), a British car magazine
 The Mitsubishi i car
 Apple iCar, the Apple electric car project
 Chery iCar, an electric car also badged as Chery eQ1
Icar Air, a charter airline based in Bosnia
Întreprinderea de Construcții Aeronautice Românești (ICAR), a former Romanian aircraft manufacturer
International Commission for Alpine Rescue
Istituto Centrale per gli Archivi (Central Institute for Archives), an institution based in Rome, Italy

See also
 Connected car, internet connected car
 intelligent car